Horse Racing Classic is a 1982 video game published by Tazumi Software.

Gameplay
Horse Racing Classic is a game in which horse racing is simulated.

Reception
Barry Austin reviewed the game for Computer Gaming World, and stated that "HRC is a good horse racing simulation, a good teaching tool, and just a darn good party game. There have been several horse race games written for the Apple (most were little more than lo-res programming exercises), but HRC stands apart."

References

External links
1984 Software Encyclopedia from Electronic Games
Review in Softalk

1982 video games
Apple II games
Apple II-only games
Horse racing video games
Racing video games
Video games developed in the United States